If Not, Winter: Fragments of Sappho is a book of translations of the poetry of Sappho by the Canadian classicist and poet Anne Carson, first published in 2002.  In 2019, the Folio Society produced an edition of If Not, Winter illustrated by Jenny Holzer.  The title comes from Carson's translation of Sappho's fragment 22.

If Not, Winter uses the Greek text of Eva-Maria Voigt's Sappho and Alcaeus with a few variations.  Along with Carson's translations, with Greek text on facing pages, the book has a short introduction, notes on the translation, a "who's who" of names in Sappho's poetry, and translations of selected ancient writings about Sappho.  Carson attempts to follow the word order of the Greek text as closely as possible, and not to add any words which cannot be found in the surviving Greek texts of Sappho, such as personal pronouns and definite articles.

If Not, Winter was praised by reviewers for its translations.  Dimitrios Yatromanolakis described Carson's translations as being of "remarkable accuracy and subtleness", and concluded that the book was "perhaps the most significant" recent (as of 2004) English translation of Sappho.  Both Emily Greenwood and Meryl Altman admired the translation for its minimalism; Greenwood describing it as "elegantly plain" and Altman as "spare and elegant". Margaret Reynolds called the translations "subtle, beautiful, precise, moving".  Elizabeth Robinson described Carson's translations of Sappho's poems "small miracles of vividness".

Some reviewers questioned how accessible If Not, Winter was for lay readers.  Though she considered it "ideal" for readers with some familiarity with ancient Greek, Altman suggested that the book might be "frustrating" to those without.  However, Emily Wilson praised Carson's notes, saying that they "should enable even the Greekless reader to understand some of the most important textual problems in Sappho".

References

Works cited
 
 
 
 
 
 
 

Sappho
Translations into English
2002 books